Jean Engone (born 1 January 1932) was the foreign minister of Gabon for 1965 to 1967.

References

1932 births
Living people
Foreign ministers of Gabon
Place of birth missing (living people)
21st-century Gabonese people